Metro Junction Mall is a shopping mall located in Kalyan, Thane district, India. It is the first mall in Kalyan.

Other details

The mall has multiple entry and exit points for better convenience to the customers. It also has parking space. A spacious area has been set up in the basement for parking. Over  is dedicated to Entertainment Zone.

The mall has a food court on top floor. The basement houses a clutter of fast food restaurants.

See also
List of shopping malls in India
List of shopping malls by country
List of largest buildings in the world

References

External links
List of Shopping malls in India at shoppingmalls.in
Metro Shoes Shopping Mall in Pakistan

Kalyan-Dombivli
Shopping malls in Mumbai
Shopping malls established in 2008
2008 establishments in Maharashtra